A number of foreign leaders have visited Ukraine during the Russian invasion, meeting with the president of Ukraine, Volodymyr Zelenskyy, and other officials, and visiting areas around the country. This list only includes heads of state and government that visited Ukraine while serving as the head of state or government.

List

See also 
 Iron diplomacy

References

2022 in international relations
2023 in international relations
2022 Russian invasion of Ukraine by country
2020s-related lists
Ukraine-related lists
Anthony Albanese
Justin Trudeau
Emmanuel Macron
Olaf Scholz
Mario Draghi
Boris Johnson
Rishi Sunak
Joe Biden